Bonner & Associates is an American public affairs firm formed in 1984.

History
Bonner & Associates was founded in Washington, D.C. in 1984 by Jack Bonner as a public affairs firm. Bonner was previously the Director for Community Relations for the City of Tucson, Arizona and also served as a top aid for US Senator, John Heinz (PA).  Bonner & Associates was one of the early public affairs companies involved in many large scale grass-roots campaigns for a wide range of clients at the local, state and federal levels of government. The company has been listed as the “pioneer of grassroots efforts” by The Wall Street Journal and The New York Times and has also been featured on C-SPAN explaining their approach to grassroots lobbying. They have worked with Fortune 500 corporations, associations and non-profits to educate and mobilize third party constituent advocates to help their clients win legislative/regulatory fights and promote public education programs.  Bonner & Associates specializes in seizing on unformed public sentiment.

The firm’s  on important legislative issues has been  in published books on issues include taxation, healthcare, transportation and international trade.

Advocacy efforts
 On December 3, 1990, Fortune Magazine reported on how Bonner put together a major campaign for the auto industry. Bonner & Associates conducted more than half of their business outside of Washington D.C at the state and local levels of government.
 On September 27, 1999, PR Week quoted leaders of the 3 million member Veterans of Foreign Wars (VFW) on why they hired Bonner & Associates to help them become a more potent political force.
 On January 1, 2012 The Officer Magazine, published by the Reserve Officers Association (ROA) describes Bonner & Associates the process for assembling a successful and effective grassroots campaign for an organization.

Criticism
 On December 18, 1986, The New York Times reported that the company was hired to run a toll free line for people to request “What Works: Schools Without Drugs,” a free book on drug abuse. The program received several large requests for the book. After an internal investigation the management at Bonner & Associates found several employees in direct violation of the policy of the firm and the contract by adding names and addresses compiled from sources other than the toll free number assigned for that purpose. The firm fired the employees and immediately reported their actions to the government.
 On December 3, 1994, National Journal reported that Bonner & Associates was hired by Philip Morris to oppose nonsmoking laws in several states.
 On March 9, 2002, the Baltimore Sun reported that Bonner & Associates was hired by PhRMA to oppose subsidized prescription drug programs for seniors.
 On August 1, 2009, The Washington Post reported that a temporary staffer contrary to firm policies was discovered by Bonner & Associates to have sent forged letters to the Hill.
 In 2009, Bonner & Associates found that a company employee was violating their company policy and was forging anti-climate bill letters to Rep. Tom Perriello (Dem-VA). The letters were supposedly from local minority groups, like the Charlottesville NAACP or Creciendo Juntos—complete with their stationery—and urged him to oppose the ACES climate change bill. The company immediately fired the employee they said was responsible and apologized.

Bibliography

References

Public relations companies of the United States